Félicien Houenou Singbo (born 25 October 1980) is a Beninese former professional footballer who played as a defender. Between 2002 and he made 19 appearances for the Benin national team. In 2003, he received a French passport.

Club career
Singbo played for Rouen and Louhans-Cuiseaux in France, Airdrie United in Scotland, Vllaznia in Albania, PAS Giannina, Olympiakos Volos and Pierikos in Greece, AE Paphos and Ayia Napa in Cyprus.

Lokomotiv Plovdiv signed Singbo to an 18-month-long deal on 13 February 2009. He was given the number 30 shirt. He made his competitive debut for Loko on 6 March 2009 against OFC Sliven 2000, in round of 16 of the Bulgarian top division.

Singbo signed with Missile Football Club of Gabon for two years on 25 October 2013.

International career
Singbo was part of the Benin national team's squad at the 2004 African Nations Cup, which finished bottom of its group in the first round of competition, thus failing to secure qualification for the quarter-finals. He was also part of the Benin squad for the 2010 African Nations Cup that did not advance past the group stage.

References

1980 births
Living people
People from Abomey
Association football defenders
Airdrieonians F.C. players
Beninese footballers
Beninese expatriate footballers
Benin international footballers
2004 African Cup of Nations players
2010 Africa Cup of Nations players
Ayia Napa FC players
AEP Paphos FC players
Kadji Sports Academy players
PFC Lokomotiv Plovdiv players
PAS Giannina F.C. players
Olympiacos Volos F.C. players
Pierikos F.C. players
KF Vllaznia Shkodër players
Scottish Football League players
First Professional Football League (Bulgaria) players
Cypriot First Division players
Cypriot Second Division players
Beninese expatriate sportspeople in Scotland
Expatriate footballers in Scotland
Beninese expatriate sportspeople in Greece
Expatriate footballers in Greece
Beninese expatriate sportspeople in Cameroon
Expatriate footballers in Cameroon
Beninese expatriate sportspeople in Cyprus
Expatriate footballers in Cyprus
Beninese expatriate sportspeople in France
Beninese expatriate sportspeople in Bulgaria
French expatriate sportspeople in Bulgaria
Expatriate footballers in Bulgaria
Beninese expatriate sportspeople in Albania
Expatriate footballers in Albania